Brian Gerard Gardiner is a retired British meteorologist, formerly working for the British Antarctic Survey. Together with Joe Farman and Jonathan Shanklin he discovered the "Ozone Hole". Their results were first published on 16 May 1985. They won the Chree medal and prize in 2001.

References

Living people
British meteorologists
Year of birth missing (living people)